Robert Ellis Jones (born July 12, 1955) is a former American football wide receiver in the National Football League. He played for the New York Jets and Cleveland Browns from 1978 to 1983. He did not play college football and signed with the Jets after a tryout in 1978.

References

1955 births
Living people
People from Sharon, Pennsylvania
Players of American football from Pennsylvania
American football wide receivers
New York Jets players
Cleveland Browns players